The Talbragar fossil site is a paleontological site of Late Jurassic (Tithonian) age in the central west of New South Wales, Australia. The site has been known for over a century during which it has been extensively excavated to the point of near exhaustion. It is now registered as a Crown Land Reserve for the preservation of fossils; access is by permit, and the collection of rocks and fossil specimens is prohibited. The  reserve is listed on the (now defunct) Register of the National Estate.

Fossils
The fossil-bearing rocks are fine-grained siltstones and mudstones that are part of the Purlawaugh Formation. They are thought to be the remnants of sediments from a small freshwater lake, surrounded by forest, which existed about 175 million years ago when Australia was part of Gondwana. The site is the only Jurassic fish site known in New South Wales.

The fossil material consists principally of the fishes that lived in the lake, as well as plants from the forest, whose remains accumulated in the sediments on the lake bed and were preserved.  Among the many species discovered are sixteen kinds of plant, such as the conifer Agathis jurassica, eight kinds of fish, several insects, and a spider.

Flora

Molluscs

Vertebrates

Arthropods

References

Mesozoic paleontological sites of Australia
Central West (New South Wales)
New South Wales places listed on the defunct Register of the National Estate
Jurassic paleontological sites
Paleontology in New South Wales
Tithonian Stage
Jurassic Australia